George Uko (born February 11, 1992) is a gridiron football defensive end who is currently a free agent. He earned a Super Bowl ring as a member of the Denver Broncos in their Super Bowl 50 victory over the Carolina Panthers. He has also been a member of the Tampa Bay Buccaneers, BC Lions, and Ottawa Redblacks.

Professional career

Tampa Bay Buccaneers
On December 16, 2014, Uko was promoted from the practice squad to the active roster.

Denver Broncos
Uko joined the Denver Broncos as a part of the practice squad. On February 7, 2016, Uko was part of the Broncos team that won Super Bowl 50 to conclude the 2015 NFL season. In the game, the Broncos defeated the Carolina Panthers by a score of 24–10. Uko was waived by the Broncos on 14 April 2016.

BC Lions 
Uko signed with the BC Lions of the Canadian Football League (CFL) on May 19, 2016. Prior to the start of the season he was transferred to the team's practice roster on June 18, 2016. He did not make an appearance for the Lions during his only year with the team.

Ottawa Redblacks 
Uko signed with the Ottawa Redblacks (CFL) in April 2018 in time for the 2018 CFL season, after not playing football in 2017. He played in 10 games for the Redblacks in his first year with the club, contributing with 19 tackles and three quarterback sacks. He was released on March 2, 2020.

References

External links
Tampa Bay Buccaneers bio

1992 births
Living people
Tampa Bay Buccaneers players
Denver Broncos players
BC Lions players
USC Trojans football players
American football defensive tackles
Canadian football defensive linemen
People from Chino, California
Players of American football from California
Sportspeople from San Bernardino County, California
American players of Canadian football
Ottawa Redblacks players